Panagiotis "Panos" Kalaitzakis (Greek: Παναγιώτης "Πάνος" Καλαϊτζάκης; born January 2, 1999) is a Greek professional basketball player for Panathinaikos of the Greek Basket League and the EuroLeague. He is a 2.00 m (6'6 ") tall small forward.

Professional career
After playing with the junior youth clubs of Aris Thessaloniki, Kalaitzakis began his professional career in the 2016–17 season, in the Greek Basket League, with the senior men's team of Aris. He was released by Aris on July 15, 2018, and he later joined the newly promoted to the first-tier Greek League team of Holargos.

On August 28, 2019, he signed with Nevėžis Kėdainiai of the Lithuanian Basketball League. 

On March 16, 2021, he signed with Lietkabelis of the Lithuanian Basketball League. During the 2021–2022 campaign, Kalaitzakis averaged 10.5 points, 4.2 rebounds, 2.9 assists and 1.6 steals in domestic competition, as well as 13 points, 2.8 rebounds, 2.8 assists and 1.6 steals in the EuroCup.

On July 2, 2022, he signed a three-year (2+1) deal with Panathinaikos of the Greek Basket League and the EuroLeague.

National team career
Kalaitzakis was a member of the junior national teams of Greece. With Greece's junior national teams, he played at the 2017 FIBA Europe Under-18 Championship, the 2018 FIBA Europe Under-20 Championship, and the 2019 FIBA Europe Under-20 Championship.

Personal life
His twin brother, Georgios, as well as their younger sibling Alexandros (born 2003), are professional basketball players. Panagiotis and Georgios have been teammates in both the Lithuanian club Nevėžis Kėdainiai and Panathinaikos.

References

External links
FIBA Archive Profile
Draftexpress.com Profile
RealGM.com Profile
Eurobasket.com Profile
Greek Basket League Profile 
Greek Basket League Profile 
Lithuanian League Profile

1999 births
Living people
Aris B.C. players
BC Lietkabelis players
BC Nevėžis players
Greek Basket League players
Greek expatriate basketball people in Lithuania
Greek men's basketball players
Holargos B.C. players
Panathinaikos B.C. players
Small forwards
Sportspeople from Heraklion
Greek twins